Bindaas is a 2010 Telugu action comedy film directed by Veeru Potla starring Manoj Manchu and Sheena Shahabadi. The film was released on 5 February 2010. Made with a budget of  the film was grossed more than 8 crore. It was considered as a Hit and also dubbed and released in Malayalam as Happy 2 Happy. It was remade in Kannada as Jinke Mari. The film won two Nandi Awards.

Cast

 Manoj Manchu as Ajay
 Sheena Shahabadi as Girija
 Ahuti Prasad as Mahendra Naidu
 Jaya Prakash Reddy as Seshadri Naidu
 Vennela Kishore as Muddu Krishna
 Subbaraju as Seshadri's youngest son
 Sunil as Sarath (Seshadri's son-in-law)
 Vijayakumar as Purushottam Naidu
 Rashmi Gautam as Geeta
 Jeeva as Garika Naidu
 Brahmanandam as Parabrahmam
 M. S. Narayana as Mastan Baba
 Vijaya Rangaraju as Mahendra's uncle
 Bhanu Chander as Ajay's father
 Raghu Babu
 Kalpana
 Telangana Shakuntala
 Sudeepa Pinky
 Paruchuri Venkateswara Rao
 Supreeth
 Shravan
 Banerjee
 Y. Kasi Viswanath
 Master Bharath
 Madhavi as Pinky
 Jayalakshmi
 Rajitha

Track listing
The soundtrack was composed by Bobo Shashi in his Telugu film debut.

Reception
Bindaas received generally positive reviews. Jeevi of Idlebrain.com states "Manoj Manchu brought a new perspective to his character with his extremely cool attitude and deserves a huge round of applause for his terrific work in this movie". Industry pundits have declared it as the biggest hit of Manoj's career.

Awards
Nandi Awards
Special Jury Award - Manoj Manchu
Best Child Actor - Master Bharath

References

External links
 
 Bindaas music launch, 9 November 2009
 Idlebrain.com review, 5 Feb 2010
 Bindaas Movie Review & Rating

2010 films
2010s Telugu-language films
Indian action comedy films
2010 masala films
Telugu films remade in other languages
2010 action comedy films
2010 comedy films